Laterina Pergine Valdarno is a comune (municipality) in the Province of Arezzo in the Italian region Tuscany.

It was established on 1 January 2018 by the merger of the municipalities of Laterina and Pergine Valdarno.

References

External links
 

Cities and towns in Tuscany